is a Japanese football player. She plays for Changnyeong in the WK League. She played for Japan national team.

Club career
Yasumoto was born in Shizuoka Prefecture on July 6, 1990. She joined TEPCO Mareeze. However, the club was disbanded for Fukushima Daiichi nuclear disaster in 2011. In May, she moved to JEF United Chiba. In 2012, she moved to Vegalta Sendai (later Mynavi Vegalta Sendai).

National team career
On May 8, 2010, when Yasumoto was 20 years old, she debuted for Japan national team against Mexico. She played 2 games Japan in 2010. She was also a member of Japan U-20 national team for 2010 U-20 World Cup in July.

National team statistics

References

External links

Vegalta Sendai

1990 births
Living people
Association football people from Chiba Prefecture
Japanese women's footballers
Japan women's international footballers
Nadeshiko League players
TEPCO Mareeze players
JEF United Chiba Ladies players
Mynavi Vegalta Sendai Ladies players
Women's association football forwards